Helvetia–La Suisse was a Swiss professional cycling team that existed from 1988 to 1992. Gilles Delion won the one-day race Giro di Lombardia with the team.

Notable riders

References

Cycling teams based in Switzerland
Defunct cycling teams based in Switzerland
1988 establishments in Switzerland
1992 disestablishments in Switzerland
Cycling teams established in 1988
Cycling teams disestablished in 1992